Abdur Rahim Mikrani,was a member of National Planning Commission of Nepal. He is a first PhD holder among Mikrani community of Nepal.

Early life
Abdur Rahim Mikrani was born on 12 April 1955 at ward no. 5 of Malangwa Municipality of Sarlahi District of Nepal. He Passed SLC from Shreemati krishna devi school of malangwa in 1972. He did MSc in Agriculture from Intstitute of Agriculture & Animal Science Rampur,Chitwan. Then he did PhD in the year of 1985 from The order of People's Friendship agriculture Institute, Tashkent, Union of Soviet Socialist Republics(USSR) on the topic of "plant breeding and seed production".

Involved in Professional Society
  Chairman, Madrasa Board "Tanzeem-e Madarise Islamia', Sarlahi . 
  Chairman, Darul Uloom Islamia Rizvia, Malangwa, Sarlahi . 
  Life member, District Red Cross Society, Sarlahi. 
  Member, Agriculture society of Nepal, Kathmandu, etc.

Books Written
 Cotton Cultivation-Pub.CDB Khajura, Nepalgunj 1991. 
 The Terminology of cotton-1994. 
 The Cotton crop-1995.

References

Mikrani
Mikrani
Mikrani
Mikrani
Mikrani
Mikrani People of Nepal